Marco Fepulea'i (born 25 April 1995) is a New Zealand-born Samoan professional rugby union player. He plays as a prop for Colomiers Rugby in the French ProD2 competition after becoming a Samoa National Rugby Union player, attending the Pacific Nations Cup in 2022. Completing two seasons for the La Giltinis in the Major League Rugby and 2021 preseason with the Super Rugby Auckland Blues team.

Fepulea'i previously played for Samoa u20s internationally and Auckland in the Mitre 10 Cup.

External links
www.marcofepuleai.com

References

1995 births
Living people
Auckland University of Technology alumni
Expatriate rugby union players in the United States
American Raptors players
New Zealand expatriate rugby union players
New Zealand expatriate sportspeople in the United States
People from Auckland
Rugby union props
LA Giltinis players
Samoan rugby union players
New Zealand rugby union players
Auckland rugby union players
Samoa international rugby union players